Austrosynthemis cyanitincta
Choristhemis flavoterminata
Choristhemis olivei
Eusynthemis aurolineata
Eusynthemis barbarae
Eusynthemis brevistyla
Eusynthemis deniseae
Eusynthemis frontalis
Eusynthemis guttata
Eusynthemis netta
Eusynthemis nigra
Eusynthemis rentziana
Eusynthemis tenera
Eusynthemis tillyardi 
Eusynthemis ursa
Eusynthemis ursula
Eusynthemis virgula
Palaeosynthemis alecto
Palaeosynthemis cervula
Palaeosynthemis cyrene
Palaeosynthemis evelynae
Palaeosynthemis gracilenta
Palaeosynthemis kimminsi
Palaeosynthemis primigenia
Palaeosynthemis wollastoni
Synthemiopsis gomphomacromioides
Synthemis ariadne
Synthemis campioni 
Synthemis eustalacta
Synthemis fenella
Synthemis feronia
Synthemis flexicauda 
Synthemis leachii
Synthemis macrostigma
Synthemis miranda
Synthemis montaguei
Synthemis pamelae
Synthemis regina
Synthemis serendipita 
Synthemis spiniger
Synthemis tasmanica
Tonyosynthemis claviculata
Tonyosynthemis ofarrelli

L